Juan Bautista 'Gianni' Vicini Cabral (Genoa, 7 April 1924–Santo Domingo, 27 April 2015) was an Italian Dominican businessman, chairman of Grupo Vicini.

Biography
Vicini was born on 7 April 1924 in Genoa, Italy, during a vacation of his family, to the Italian-Dominican businessman Felipe Augusto Vicini Perdomo (half-brother of President Juan Bautista Vicini Burgos) and Dominican heiress Amelia María Cabral Bermúdez (daughter of José María Cabral y Báez and sister of José María Cabral Bermúdez). His siblings were: Laura Amelia (1925–2006), who married Amadeo Barletta Ricart, the son of Amadeo Barletta Barletta; José María (1926–2007), who married María Elena Pérez Branger; and Felipe de Jesús Vicini Cabral (1936–1997). He was first cousin of Donald Reid Cabral, President de facto of the Dominican Republic, first cousin-once removed of José María Cabral, film director, and second cousin of Peggy Cabral, vice mayor of Santo Domingo.

He married Alma Stella Altagracia Lluberes Henríquez (1936–1992), the daughter of Mario Rafael Lluberes Abréu and Josefa Stella Henríquez Vásquez (a granddaughter of intellectual Federico Henríquez y Carvajal and diplomat Francisco Leonte Vásquez Lajara; the latter was brother of President Horacio Vásquez Lajara). They had 3 children: Felipe Augusto Antonio (b. 1960), Amelia Stella María (b. 1974), and Juan Bautista Vicini Lluberes (b. 1975).

In 1936 his father died and Vinici became the chairman of Grupo Vicini, one of the largest sugar companies in the Dominican Republic. During his tenure, Grupo Vicini became the main private sugar producer and afterwards the most important corporation in the Dominican Republic, with investments in many key economic sectors.

References
 Fallece el empresario Juan Bautista Vicini Cabral a los 91 años, Diario Libre. 28 April 2015.
, Julio Amable.  Desde Génova: los Vicini, Hoy (Instituto Dominicano de Genealogía). 2 May 2015.
, Julio Amable.  Juan Bautista Vinici Cabral: Genealogía Ascendente y Colateral, Hoy (Instituto Dominicano de Genealogía). 16 May 2015.
, Katheryn.  Cardenal oficia eucaristía en memoria de Juan Bautista (Gianni) Vicini, Listín Diario. 8 May 2015.

1924 births
2015 deaths
Descendants of Buenaventura Báez
Dominican Republic chairpersons of corporations
Dominican Republic people of Canarian descent
Dominican Republic people of French descent
Dominican Republic people of Italian descent
Dominican Republic people of Portuguese descent
Dominican Republic people of Venezuelan descent
Dominican Republic people of Walloon descent
People from Genoa
Italian chairpersons of corporations
Italian mass media owners
Italian people of Dominican Republic descent
White Dominicans